The Rowley Village Forge Site is a historic colonia-era iron foundry site in Boxford, Massachusetts.  The first iron forge in the area was established on Fish Brook in 1668 by Henry Leonard of the Leonard family, who were instrumental in the Saugus Iron Works further south.  This business ran until about 1681, but the site also saw industrial uses into the 19th century, with sawmills and gristmills quickly replacing the foundry after it failed.  Remnants of these works are visible from trails through conservation land off Lockwood Drive.

The site was added to the National Register of Historic Places in 2001.

See also
National Register of Historic Places listings in Essex County, Massachusetts
List of the oldest buildings in Massachusetts

References

Industrial buildings and structures on the National Register of Historic Places in Massachusetts
Buildings and structures in Essex County, Massachusetts
National Register of Historic Places in Essex County, Massachusetts